Rapthi Raffella Dannielle Kerkoven (born 6 October 1987) is a Sri Lankan model and former beauty pageant title-holder.

Biography 
Kerkoven was born in Colombo, Sri Lanka. She has completed her education with a diploma in airline ticketing and reservations, and works as a model. Kerkoven is the niece of Sri Lankan designer Kirthi Sri Karunaratna and the daughter of former model Rehana Kerkoven. Brian Kerkoven, the renowned designer, is her paternal uncle.

Kerkoven began modelling when she was 12 years old. She competed in Miss World 2006, representing Sri Lanka, after being nominated by a local travel agency. The 2006 Miss World Sri Lanka pageant having been cancelled due to security reasons. In 2012, Kerkoven entered the International Best Female Model World pageant, held in Spain, and placed second runner-up. In 2014, she won the title of Asia's Top Fashion Model of the Year (Female Category) at the Fashion Asia Awards.

In 2017, Kerkoven was appointed a World Peace Ambassador by the World Peace and Diplomacy Organisation India.

References

1987 births
Burgher models
Living people
Miss World 2006 delegates
People from Colombo
Sri Lankan beauty pageant winners